Echium plantagineum, commonly known as purple viper's-bugloss or Patterson's curse, is a species of the genus Echium native to western and southern Europe (from southern England south to Iberia and east to the Crimea), northern Africa, and southwestern Asia (east to Georgia). It has also been introduced to Australia, South Africa and United States, where it is an invasive weed. Due to a high concentration of pyrrolizidine alkaloids, it is poisonous to grazing livestock, especially those with very simple digestive systems, like horses.

Description
Echium plantagineum is a winter annual plant growing to 20–60cm tall, with rough, hairy, lanceolate leaves up to 14 cm long. The flowers are purple, 15–20 mm long, with all the stamens protruding, and borne on a branched spike.

Taxonomy
The Latin genus name comes from the Greek word 'ekhis' which means viper (a type of snake). Some sources say that this is due to the seeds resembling a viper's head. Others claim that the forking at the end of the thin flower style resembles a viper's tongue. It is also claimed that the plant roots when eaten with wine could provide a folk cure for a snake bite.
The Latin specific epithet plantagineum then refers to the leaves of the plant which are similar to those of a plantain.

Invasive species

Echnium plantagineum has become an invasive species in Australia, where it is also known as Salvation Jane (particularly in South Australia), blueweed, Lady Campbell weed, Paterson's Curse and Riverina bluebell.

In the United States, the species has become naturalised in parts of California, Oregon, and some eastern states and areas such as northern Michigan. In Oregon it has been declared a noxious weed.

Toxicity
Echium plantagineum contains pyrrolizidine alkaloids and is poisonous. When eaten in large quantities, it causes reduced livestock weight, and death in severe cases, due to liver damage. Paterson's curse can also kill horses, and irritate the udders of dairy cows and the skin of humans. After the 2003 Canberra bushfires, a large bloom of the plant occurred on the burned land, and many horses became ill and died from grazing on it. Because the alkaloids can also be found in the nectar of Paterson's curse, the honey made from it should be blended with other honeys to dilute the toxins.

References

External links
 
 
 

plantagineum
Flora of Africa
Flora of Asia
Flora of Europe
Taxa named by Carl Linnaeus